Nokia network monitor or Monitor Mode was a hidden mode on most Nokia cell phones used to measure network parameters. Additionally there are measurements for phone and battery temperature and other phone specific measurements and tests. The mode can only be activated over a special FBus, or MBUS cable; or in some cases over infrared. Free software exists on the internet that allows one to activate this mode.

The first step is to select a Nokia Phone like Nokia 3310 that has network monitor then activate the monitor. To activate, download software such as Gnokii, logomanager, or N-Monitor by Anderas Schmidt and connect the mobile with a FBus cable. In Nokia phones you just activate the monitor and not upload it to the phone, as it is already present.

External links 
 "The Nokia Network Monitor" by Nuukiaworld, a good starting point
 Download N-Monitor by Andreas Schmidt
 Description by Logomanager 
 FAQ

Nokia services